Sir Stephen John Arthur Eyre (born 17 October 1957), styled Mr Justice Eyre, is a British High Court judge.

Personal Life 
Eyre was born in Stourbridge on the 17th of October 1957 where he attended Solihull School in the West Midlands.

He later began his studies in 1976 at New College, Oxford, taking a Bachelor of Arts in 1979  and Bachelor of Civil Law in 1980. He would later taking a Master of Laws in 2010 at Cardiff University.

Eyre married Margaret Goodman in 1989.

Legal Career 
He was called to the Bar in 1981 by Inner Temple, making him the first lawyer in his family. He then began work in 'Fountain Court Chambers' until 2002 where he moved to 'St Phillips Chambers'.

Eyre was appointed as a Recorder in 2005 and in 2007, appointed as a Fee-Paid Judge for the First-tier Tribunal of Health, Education and Social Care.

Eyre was appointed King's Counsel in 2015.

He would later be appointed as a Circuit judge in 2015 and assigned to the Birmingham, Leamington Spa and Wolverhampton Circuit. In 2017 he was appointed to the Business and Property Courts in Manchester and Liverpool, as a Specialist Civil Circuit Judge.

In 2021, Eyre was appointed as a High Court Judge and assigned to the King's Bench Division. He received customary title of Knight Bachelor in March 2022 at Windsor Castle.

References 

1957 births
Living people
British judges

Alumni of Cardiff University